Scrobipalpa similis is a moth in the family Gelechiidae. It was described by Povolný in 1973. It is found in China (Xinjiang), Mongolia, Russia (Chitinskaya oblast) and south-eastern Kazakhstan.

References

Scrobipalpa
Moths described in 1973